Enumerate could refer to:
 Enumeration, a mathematical, theoretical concept of an exhaustive listing of compatible items
 Enumerate (project), a collaborative research project about digitization of cultural heritage
 Enumerated type in computer programming